Below is a list of fatal snakebites that occurred in Australia.  Omitted incidents include cases where someone died from falling after receiving a bite. Some of the comments include the first aid or treatment that was attempted. For the older fatalities, the term ligature meant wrapping a limb or finger with a string to act like a tourniquet, and the term scarify meant cutting the skin so blood flows out of the body, presumably to flush venom. Current practice advises not washing the affected body part so that medical personnel can sample venom residue on the skin to determine which type of snake was involved.

Although Australian snakes can be very venomous, comparatively little is known about the protein compositions of venoms from Australian snakes, compared to those of Asia and America. Wide access to antivenom and adequate medical care has made deaths exceedingly rare with only a few fatalities each year.  Australian snakes possess potent venom: 5 of the world's top 10 most venomous snakes live in Australia.

The estimated incidence of snakebites annually in Australia is between 3 and 18 per 100,000 with an average mortality rate of 0.03 per 100,000 per year, or roughly 1 to 2 persons, down from 13 persons per year in the 1920s. Between 1979 and 1998 there were 53 deaths from snakes, according to data obtained from the Australian Bureau of Statistics. Between 1942 and 1950 there were 56 deaths from snakebite recorded in Australia. Of 28 deaths in the 1945-1949 period, 18 occurred in Queensland, 6 in New South Wales, 3 in Western Australia and 1 in Tasmania. Globally, 1.8–2.7 million people are envenomed annually, with more than 125,000 people dying, and for every fatality there are another 3 to 4 people permanently disabled. In 2017, the World Health Organization added snakebite envenoming to their list of Neglected tropical diseases, requesting the cooperation of antivenom agencies worldwide.

A Queensland Government occupational health publication says that "Snakes are not usually aggressive and do not seek confrontation with humans but may retaliate if provoked. The important thing to remember is to never attempt to catch or kill a snake – most snake bites occur when people are trying to do this."

19th century

20th century

1900s

1910s

1920s

1930s

1940s

1950s

1970s

1980s

1990s

21st century

2000s

2010s

2020s

See also 
 Snakes of Australia
 Epidemiology of snakebites
 List of dangerous snakes
 Snakebite
 Venomous snakes
 List of fatal snake bites in the United States

References

External links
Australian Snakes - Overview

 
Lists of deaths due to animal attacks in Australia